John Govan may refer to:
 John Govan (cricketer), Australian cricketer
 John George Govan, Scottish businessman and evangelist